Huo is a Chinese surname. It is pronounced as Fok in Cantonese.

During the Zhou Dynasty, King Wu awarded land to his brother Shuchu (叔處) in "Huo" (modern Huozhou, Shanxi), and Shuchu's descendants adopted "Huo" as their family name.

Notable people
 Huo Qubing (霍去病; 140–117 BC), Western Han Dynasty general
 Huo Guang (霍光; d. 68 BC), Huo Qubing's half-brother, Western Han Dynasty statesman
 Huo Chengjun (霍成君; d. 54 BC), Huo Guang's daughter, Western Han Dynasty empress
 Huo Jun (霍峻; 177-216), Eastern Han Dynasty general
 Huo Yi (霍弋), Huo Jun's son, Shu general of the Three Kingdoms period
 Huo Ji (霍冀; 1516-1575), Ming Dynasty official
 Huo Yuanjia (霍元甲; 1868-1910), Qing Dynasty martial artist
 Henry Fok Ying-tung (霍英東; Huo Yingdong; 1923-2006), Hong Kong businessman
 Timothy Fok Tsun-ting (霍震霆; Huo Zhenting; b. 1946), Henry Fok's eldest son, Hong Kong politician and entrepreneur
 Ian Fok Tsun-wan (霍震寰; Huo Zhenhuan; b. 1949), Henry Fok's second son, Hong Kong entrepreneur
 Canning Fok Kin-ning (霍建寧; Huo Jianning; b. 1951), Hong Kong entrepreneur
 Clarence Fok Yiu-leung (霍耀良; Huo Yaoliang; b. 1958), Hong Kong film director and producer
 Serge Huo-chao-si (霍 ??; Huo Chaosi; b. 1968), French Cartoonist
 Wallace Huo Chien-hwa (霍建華; Huo Jianhua; b. 1979), Taiwanese actor and singer
 Huo Siyan (霍思燕; b. 1981), actress
 Raulito Carbonell Huo, Puerto Rican actor, comedian, singer and lawyer of Catalan and Chinese descent

Chinese-language surnames
Individual Chinese surnames